Model 67 may refer to:
 Curtiss BF2C Goshawk (Model 67), a United States naval biplane aircraft in the 1930s 
 IBM System/360 Model 67, an IBM mainframe computer of the late 1960s
 Model 67 mine, an Austrian anti-tank mine
 Mauser-Norris Model 67, a German bolt-action rifle
 Smith & Wesson Model 67, an American revolver
 Winchester Model 67, an American bolt-action rifle